On Trial is a 1939 drama film directed by Terry O. Morse and produced and distributed by Warner Bros. It is based on the 1914 Broadway play by Elmer Rice. Warners had previously filmed Rice's play in 1928  as an early talkie, also called On Trial, and, earlier, in 1917, Essanay Studios had made a silent version with the same title.

Cast

Margaret Lindsay as Mae Strickland
John Litel as Robert Strickland
Edward Norris as William Arbuckle
Janet Chapman as Doris Strickland
James Stephenson as Gerald Trask
Nedda Harrigan as Joan Trask
Larry Williams as Glover
William B. Davidson as Gray

Earl Dwire as Judge
Gordon Hart as Dr. Morgan
Kenneth Harlan as John Trumbell, juror 3
Vera Lewis as Mrs. Leeds, juror 8
Nat Carr as Clerk
Stuart Holmes as Mr. Summers, juror 6
Charles Trowbridge as Henry Dean
Sidney Bracey as Joe Burke

Production
The working title for the film was "The Strickland Case", and it was originally intended to be directed by William McGann.

Preservation status
This film is preserved in the Library of Congress collection.

References

External links

1939 films
American films based on plays
Films directed by Terry O. Morse
Warner Bros. films
1939 drama films
American black-and-white films
American drama films
1930s American films